I'm Ready may refer to:

Music

Albums 
I'm Ready (Muddy Waters album), 1978
I'm Ready (Natalie Cole album), 1983
I'm Ready (Tevin Campbell album), 1993
I'm Ready, by Elva Hsiao, 2011
I'm Ready, an EP by AJR, 2013

Songs 
"I'm Ready" (AJR song), 2013
"I'm Ready" (Muddy Waters song), 1954
"I'm Ready" (Bryan Adams song), 1983
"I'm Ready" (Cherie song), 2004
"I'm Ready" (Sori song), 2018
"I'm Ready" (Sam Smith and Demi Lovato song), 2020
"I'm Ready" (Tevin Campbell song), 1993
 "I'm Ready", by Fats Domino, 1959
 "I'm Ready", by Gin Blossoms from the album No Chocolate Cake, 2010
 "I'm Ready", by Kano, 1980
 "I'm Ready", by Tulisa Contostavlos from the album The Female Boss, 2012
 "I'm Ready", by Uriah Heep from the album Into the Wild, 2011
 "I'm Ready", by Jaden Smith from the soundtrack of the 2020 video game Spider-Man: Miles Morales

Other uses
 Im Ready or IMReady, public safety portal and mobile app by GMA News and Public Affairs